The Murrah buffalo  is a breed of water buffalo (Bubalus bubalis) mainly kept for milk production. It originates in Haryana and Punjab of India, where it is kept in the districts of Bhiwani, Agra, Hisar, Rohtak, Jind, Jhajhar, Fatehabad, Gurgaon and the capital region of Delhi.
It has been used to improve the milk production of dairy buffalo in other countries, such as Italy, Bulgaria and Egypt.
In Brazil, this breed of buffalo is used for production of both meat and milk. Murrahs sell for a high price.

Among Indian buffalo breeds, Murrah is noted to have the highest milk yield.

Appearance

Murrah buffaloes are jet black in colour, sometimes with white markings on the face or legs. Their eyes are black, active, and prominent in females, but slightly shrunken in males and should not be walled, i.e., the cornea should not have whiteness. Their necks are long and thin in females and thick and massive in males. Their ears are short, thin, and alert.

They typically have short and tightly curved horns.

Research institutes 
These institutes have ongoing research programs to enhance and disseminate the Murrah breed:
The Central Institute for Research on Buffaloes in Hisar is the premier research institute in India for improving the Murrah buffalo breed and for disseminating Murrah buffalo semen to farmers and buffalo breeders for fertilization of cows. It has cloned a Murrah buffalo to replicate the high quality breed.
 National Dairy Research Institute is an agro-dairy university in Karnal.
 The Philippine Carabao Center in the Philippines breeds Murrah buffaloes for adapting them to the local tropical conditions.

See also
 List of water buffalo breeds 
 List of Indian cattle breeds
 Indian Agricultural Research Institute (IARI)
 Government Livestock Farm, Hisar, research and dissemination institute to improve the feed for cattle to enhance the milk yield, situated next to the CIRB Hisar.
 Murrah buffalo

References

Animal husbandry in Haryana
Water buffalo breeds originating in India